Nematocampa brehmeata is a moth of the family Geometridae. It is found in California.

The length of the forewings is 12–14 mm for males and 13–14 mm for females. The shape and pattern of the wings is similar to Nematocampa resistaria, but the dark, purplish-brown shading on the outer third of the wings in males tends to appear reduced, narrowed, or otherwise broken up. The dark shading of the outer third of the wings is lost entirely in females. The ground colour varies from light yellow to orange yellow in both males and females. Adults are on wing from June to August.

References

Ourapterygini
Endemic fauna of California
Moths of North America
Moths described in 1907
Fauna without expected TNC conservation status